The Love Doctor is a 1929 American comedy film directed by Melville W. Brown and written by Guy Bolton, Herman J. Mankiewicz, and J. Walter Ruben based upon a play by Victor Mapes and Winchell Smith. The film stars Richard Dix, June Collyer, Morgan Farley, Miriam Seegar, Winifred Harris, and Lawford Davidson. The film was released on October 5, 1929, by Paramount Pictures.

Previously filmed as a silent The Boomerang (1925) starring Anita Stewart.

Cast
Richard Dix as Dr. Gerald Summer
June Collyer as Virginia Moore
Morgan Farley as Bud Woodbridge 
Miriam Seegar as Grace Tyler
Winifred Harris as Mrs. Woodbridge
Lawford Davidson as Preston DeWitt
Gale Henry as Lucy

References

External links

Several stills at c1n3.org (James Whale)

1929 films
1920s English-language films
Silent American comedy films
1929 comedy films
Paramount Pictures films
American black-and-white films
Films directed by Melville W. Brown
Films scored by Karl Hajos
1920s American films